J.League 100 Year Plan club status,  is a status given to Japanese non-league football clubs. The applicant must have an intention to become a professional club and to join the professional league, J.League, that governs the top three levels of the Japanese football pyramid. Usually clubs from the fourth level, Japan Football League, which is the top tier for amateur clubs, apply for the status; however, it is open for all amateur clubs down to prefectural leagues. The applications are reviewed and inspected by a committee formed by the league. From the 2014 to 2022 seasons, the associate membership was the main criteria for J3 promotion. The system allows the League to identify such clubs, to provide necessary resources/advice, and to ease the transition to professionalism.

Former associate membership systems

1993–1998
Originally, when the professional league was formed in 1993 with ten clubs, the league's intention was to keep the number of clubs to 10 for at least two to three years, and then gradually increase the roster to 16 by adding a club or two in year-to-year basis. However, the league had underestimated the demands; there were far more clubs seeking top-flight football then the league have anticipated. Thus, the league adopted associate membership system for the clubs in then the second-tier Japan Football League. Just like the current system, associate clubs finishing in the top two were allowed to be promoted to the league, given that they have passed the final inspection by the league. Associate members also had the right to participate in Yamazaki Nabisco Cup games and reserve league games.

This system was abolished in 1998 with the establishment of J.League Division 2 and the dissolution of the old JFL. Three remaining associate members were admitted to the J2 and Honda FC decided to maintain amateur status and joined the newly created JFL.

2006–2013
After its establishment in 1999, J.League Division 2 became the frontier of J.League expansion, feeding from the simultaneously established Japan Football League. In their first seven years of co-existence, every club that applied for promotion was individually examined by the league. Five teams were promoted this way, but as the number of applicants increased over time, in October 2005 the JFA initiated the establishment of the new association membership system in order to provide an incentive for amateur clubs to obtain a sound economical and business basis necessary to J.League membership.

The criteria for such membership were developed by joint JFA–J.League committee in early 2006. They covered various aspects of the club development, with the particular stress on organizational stability, adequate infrastructure, and support from the local government, sponsors, and community. Unlike the previous system, this membership has been targeted not only to JFL clubs, but to all amateurs club in the football pyramid, including regional and prefectural leagues.

Below is a list of criteria for associate membership in their last edition of September 1, 2012.

Club organization
 Must be organized as a public corporation or NPO solely devoted to football.
Company and university clubs do not qualify
At least half of the shares of stock must be Japanese ownership
 Must hire at least three administrative employees, one of which must be in a managerial position.
 Must have a proper payroll system in accordance with Japanese law.
 Must complete an annual tax audit.
 Must be financially feasible.
(Note: The league recommends ¥1.5 million of capital by promotion to J2 and 5 million by the end of the third year in J2.)
 Must secure sponsorship of at least ¥1 million.

Home town
 Must be approved by respective prefectural football association.
 Must be approved by the home town's government in writing.

Home stadium/training facility
 It must have a capacity of at least 10,000 and a natural grass pitch (in lieu of this, the club must have plans to build a stadium with these minimum requirements).
 It must be located in the proposed hometown.
 It must have a press box and a conference room for pre- and post-match news conferences.
 The club must secure training facilities within the proposed hometown.

Others
 The club must currently play in JFL, a regional league, or a prefectural league.
 The club must aim for admission to J.League.
 The club must have plans for a youth system.

The new associate membership system lasted for eight years and came to its logical finish after the number of J2 clubs reached 22 (the original target) in 2012 season. The next year saw the establishment of J3 League which incorporated most of the remaining associate members.

Since 2006, 29 clubs have applied for the J.League associate member status and 25 have received it, though for many clubs more than one application was necessary. Of those 25 that received the status, 11 were promoted to J2; 9 more were admitted to J3 League in 2013; and 5 remaining members (along with three pending applications) transitioned to the new 100 Year Plan status in 2014. The table below summarizes the history of associate membership applications and J.League promotions/admissions. Promotions listed were to J2, unless indicated otherwise.
Grey – membership declined
Light green – remaining members, transformed into a 100 Year Plan status in 2014

† Listed is the league the club participated at the time of application, not necessary the league that the club currently belongs to.

100 Year Plan status (since 2014) 
For a short time after the establishment of J3 League in 2014, the league designated J3 clubs as "associate members," as opposed to "full members" of J1 and J2. In order to avoid confusion with associate membership system for future participants, it was decided to change the name of the latter status to "100 Year Plan" status. The J.League later abolished the associate membership naming for J3 clubs, but the new name for future members remained.

Participation criteria
The criteria for the 100 Year Plan status are largely similar to associate membership of the past, though they are generally more relaxed because of less strict regulations for J3 participation in comparison with J2. Below are the criteria for the 2014 season.

Club organization
 Must be organized as a public corporation or NPO solely devoted to football and exist in this status for no less than one year
The majority of the shares or stock must be Japanese owned
 Must employ at least four administrative employees, one of whom must have managerial position
 Must have proper payroll system according to Japanese law
 Must have proper financial management and conduct annual tax audit
 Must hold intellectual rights for the club name, logo, and all associated trademarks

Home town and stadium/training facility
 Must be approved by respective Prefectural Football Association
 Must be approved by the hometown government in writing
 Home stadium must be located in the proposed hometown
 Must secure training facilities within the proposed hometown

Others
 Must currently play in JFL, regional league, or prefectural league
 Must aim for eventual admission to J.League
 Must have a working soccer school/youth system that exists for no less than one year

Criteria for J3 promotion
The 100 Year Plan status alone was only a prerequisite for J3 promotion until the condition of holding it to apply for a league license was repealed in January 2023 as part of revisions to J3's club licensing regulations. The club must still comply with the following requirements in order to receive the J3 license necessary for promotion.

 Must have a stadium that complies with J3 standards (capacity 2,000 or above) and passes the league examination
 Must pass a J3 licensing examination by the league
 Must finish within top two of the JFL
 Must have average attendance of home games no less than 2,000 spectators in the prior season, with significant effort recognized to reach that number
 Must make efforts to develop a stable support organization in the year immediately before joining
 Must be deemed an appropriate J3 member by the board of directors based on club activities

Application history
Green – promoted to J.League
Gold – current members
Grey – membership declined
White – application pending or membership withdrawn

† Listed is the league the club participated at the time of application, not necessary the league that the club currently belongs to.

Current members (current league in parentheses)
 Criacao Shinjuku (JFL)
 Nankatsu SC (Kantō League D1)
 Okinawa SV (JFL)
 Tochigi City (Kantō League D1)
 Tokyo 23 (Kantō League D1)
 Verspah Oita (JFL)
 Vonds Ichihara (Kantō League D1)

Past members
 Azul Claro Numazu (JFL)
 Cobaltore Onagawa (Tohoku League D1)
 FC Imabari (JFL)
 Iwaki FC (JFL)
 Kagoshima United (JFL)
 Kochi United SC (JFL)
 Nara Club (JFL)
 FC Osaka (JFL)
 ReinMeer Aomori (JFL)
 Renofa Yamaguchi (JFL)
 Suzuka Point Getters (JFL)
 Tegevajaro Miyazaki (JFL)
 Tokyo Musashino City (JFL)
 Tonan Maebashi (Kantō League D2)
 Vanraure Hachinohe (JFL)
 Veertien Mie (JFL)

See also
J.League
Japan Football League
Japanese association football league system
List of football clubs in Japan

References

External links

Associate Membership